Żabno k. Chojnic is a PKP railway station in Żabno k. Chojnic (Pomeranian Voivodship), Poland.

Lines crossing the station

Train services
The station is served by the following services:
Regional services (R) Chojnice - Brusy - Lipusz - Koscierzyna

References 

Żabno k. Chojnic article at Polish Stations Database, URL accessed at 29 March 2006

Zabno k. Chojnic
Chojnice County